Haidian Christian Church is a church located in Zhongguancun, Haidian District, Beijing. It is operated by the Three-Self Patriotic Movement, a state-registered Protestant Church in Mainland China.

History
The church was founded in 1933.  The pastor of the church, Wu Weiqing, graduated from Nanjing Union Theological Seminary in 1989 and has a DMin from Fuller Theological Seminary. He speaks English fluently.

Architecture

Congregation
Haidian Christian Church is located near Tsinghua University, Peking University and numerous IT headquarters such as Sina.com in China's technology hub. As such, a large percentage of attendants are young.

References

External links
Haidian Christian Church at the China Internet Information Center

Churches in Beijing
Three-Self Patriotic Movement
Gerkan, Marg and Partners buildings
Buildings and structures in Haidian District